The Russian Air Force (VVS) is a branch of the Russian Aerospace Forces, the latter being formed on 1 August 2015 with the merging of the Russian Air Force and the Russian Aerospace Defence Forces. The modern VVS was originally established on 7 May 1992 following Boris Yeltsin's creation of the Ministry of Defence. However, the Russian Federation's air force can trace its lineage and traditions back to the Imperial Russian Air Service (1912–1917) and the Soviet Air Forces (1918–1991).

History

1991–2000
Following the dissolution of the Soviet Union into its fifteen constituent republics in December 1991, the aircraft and personnel of the Soviet Air Forces—the VVS were divided among the newly independent states. General Pyotr Deynekin, the former deputy commander-in-chief of the Soviet Air Forces, became the first commander of the new organisation on 24 August 1991. Russia received the majority of the most modern fighters and 65% of the manpower. The major commands of the former Soviet VVS—the Long-Range Aviation, Military Transport Aviation and Frontal Aviation were renamed, with few changes, Russian VVS commands.

However, many regiments, aircraft, and personnel were claimed by the republics they were based in, forming the core of the new republics' air forces. Some aircraft in Belarus and Ukraine (such as Tupolev Tu-160s) were returned to Russia, sometimes in return for debt reductions, as well as a long-range aviation division based at Dolon in Kazakhstan.

During the 1990s, the financial stringency was felt throughout the armed forces made its mark on the VVS as well. Pilots and other personnel could sometimes not get their wages for months, and on occasion resorted to desperate measures: four MiG-31 pilots at Yelizovo in the Far East went on hunger strike in 1996 to demand back pay which was several months overdue, and the problem was only resolved by diverting unit money intended for other tasks. As a result of the cutbacks, infrastructure became degraded as well, and in 1998, 40% of military airfields needed repair.

The VVS participated in the First Chechen War (1994–1996) and the Second Chechen War (1999–2002). These campaigns also presented significant difficulties for the VVS including the terrain, lack of significant fixed targets and insurgents armed with Stinger and Strela-2M surface-to-air missiles.

The former Soviet Air Defence Forces remained independent for several years under Russian control, only merging with the Air Forces in 1998. The decree merging the two forces was issued by President Boris Yeltsin on 16 July 1997. During 1998 altogether 580 units and formations were disbanded, 134 reorganised, and over 600 given a new jurisdiction. The redistribution of forces affected 95% of aircraft, 98% of helicopters, 93% of anti-aircraft missile complexes, 95% of the equipment of radiotechnical troops, 100% of anti-aircraft missiles and over 60% of aviation armament. More than 600,000 tons of material changed location and 3,500 aircraft changed airfields. Military Transport Aviation planes took more than 40,000 families to new residence areas.

The short-lived operational commands were abolished. Two air armies, the 37th Air Army (long-range aviation) and the 61st Air Army (former Military Transport Aviation), were established directly under the Supreme Command. The former frontal aviation and anti-aircraft forces were organised as Air Force Armies and Anti-Aircraft Defense Armies under the military district commanders.

There were initially four such armies with headquarters in St.Petersburg (Leningrad Military District), Rostov-on-Don (North Caucasus Military District), Khabarovsk (Far East Military District), and Chita (Siberian Military District). Two military districts had separate Air and Air Defence Corps. When the Transbaikal Military District and Siberian Military District were merged, the 14th Air and Air Defence Forces Army was formed to serve as the air force formation in the area.

The number of servicemen in the air force was reduced to about 185,000 from the former combined number of 318,000. 123,500 positions were abolished, including almost 1,000 colonel positions. The resignation of 3000 other servicemen included 46 generals of which 15 were colonel generals. On 29 December 1998 Colonel General Anatoly Kornukov, a former Air Defence Forces officer and new commander-in-chief of the merged force, succeeding Deynekin, reported to the Russian defence minister that the task had 'in principle been achieved'. General Kornukov established the new headquarters of the force in Zarya, near Balashikha, 20 km east of the centre of Moscow, in the former PVO central command post, where the CIS common air defence system is directed from.

2001–2010
In 1999 Vladimir Putin became Prime Minister of Russia and then President in 2000; he continued to hold one or the other of these offices through every year since.
 
In December 2003 the aviation assets of the Russian Ground Forces—mostly helicopters—were transferred to the VVS, following the shooting down of a Mi-26 helicopter in Chechnya on 19 August 2002 that claimed 19 lives. The former Army Aviation was in its previous form intended for the direct support of the Ground Forces, by providing their tactical air support, conducting tactical aerial reconnaissance, transporting airborne troops, providing fire support of their actions, electronic warfare, setting of minefield barriers and other tasks. The former Army Aviation was subsequently managed by the Chief of the Department of Army Aviation. In 2010, it was announced that the 2003 decision to transfer Ground Force Aviation to the Air Force was reversed, with the transfer back to the Ground Forces to occur sometime in 2015 or 2016.

During the 2000s, the Air Forces continued to suffer from a lack of resources for pilot training. In the 1990s Russian pilots achieved approximately 10% of the flight hours of the United States Air Force. The 2007 edition of the International Institute for Strategic Studies (IISS) Military Balance listed pilots of tactical aviation flying 20–25 hours a year, 61st Air Army pilots (former Military Transport Aviation), 60 hours a year, and Army Aviation under VVS control 55 hours a year.

In 2007 the VVS resumed the Soviet-era practice of deploying its strategic bomber aircraft on long-range patrols. This ended a 15-year unilateral suspension due to fuel costs and other economic difficulties after the collapse of the Soviet Union. Patrols towards the North Pole, the Atlantic and the Pacific Ocean were reinstated, bringing the planes often close to NATO territory, including in one instance flying over the Irish Sea between the United Kingdom and Ireland.

During the 2008 South Ossetian War, the VVS suffered losses of between four and seven aircraft due to Georgian anti-aircraft fire. The 2008 Russian military reforms were promptly announced following the war, which according to Western experts were intended to address many inadequacies discovered as a result. The reforms commenced during early 2009, in which air armies were succeeded by commands, and most air regiments becoming air bases. Aviation Week & Space Technology confirmed that the reorganisation would be completed by December 2009 and would see a 40 percent reduction in aircrew numbers.

In February 2009, the Russian newspaper Kommersant reported that 200 of the 291 MiG-29s currently in service across all Russian air arms were unsafe and would have to be permanently grounded. This action would remove from service about a third of Russia's total fighter force, some 650 aircraft. On 5 June 2009, the Chief of the General Staff, Nikolai Makarov said of the VVS that "They can run bombing missions only in daytime with the sun shining, but they miss their targets anyway". Maj. Gen. Pavel Androsov said that Russia's long-range bombers would be upgraded in 2009 with the aim of being able to hit within 20 meters of their targets.

Also in September 2009 it was reported that an East European network of the Joint CIS Air Defense System was to be set up by Russia and Belarus. This network was intended to protect the airspace of the two countries as defined in the supranational 1999 Union State treaty. Its planned composition was to include five Air Force units, 10 anti-aircraft units, five technical service and support units and one electronic warfare unit. It was to be placed under the command of a Russian or Belarusian Air Force or Air Defence Force senior commander.

In July 2010, Russian jet fighters made the first nonstop flights from European Russia to the Russian Far East. By August 2010, according to the Commander-in-Chief of the VVS Alexander Zelin, the average flight hours of a pilot in Russian tactical aviation had reached 80 hours a year, while in army aviation and military transport aviation it exceeded 100 hours a year. On 15 August 2010, the Russian Air Force temporarily grounded its fleet of Su-25 ground attack aircraft to conduct an investigation into a crash that happened during a training mission. The Russian Defence Ministry said that the plane crashed on 6 August 2010, 60 km to the north-west of Step air base in Siberia, according to RIA Novosti.

2011–2020
According to the instructions of the General Staff of the Armed Forces on 1 September 2011, the unmanned aircraft of the VVS and the personnel operating them moved under the command structure of the Russian Ground Forces.

As of 2012, the VVS operated a total of 61 air bases, including 26 air bases with tactical aircraft, of which 14 are equipped with fighter aircraft. In terms of flight hours, pilots in the Western Military District averaged 125 hours over the 2012 training year. Pilots from the Kursk air base achieved an average of 150 hours, with transport aviation averaging 170 hours.

In February 2014, during the early periods of Russia's annexation of Crimea, the assets of the VVS in the Southern Military District were activated and flown to the peninsula for supporting the rest of the operations.

On 1 August 2015, the Russian Air Force, along with the Russian Aerospace Defence Forces and the Air Defense Troops, were merged into a new branch of the armed forces, now officially called the Russian Aerospace Forces.

On 30 September 2015, the VVS launched a military intervention in Syria, in Syria's Homs region. On 24 November 2015, during a bombing mission, a Turkish Air Force F-16 shot down a Russian Sukhoi Su-24 that Turkey claimed had violated its airspace.

In March 2020, the indiscriminate bombing of civilian targets by the VVS in Syria has been described as "amounting to war crime" by a United Nations Human Rights Council report.

On 9 November 2020, a Russian Mil Mi-24 attack helicopter was shot down mistakenly by the Azerbaijani Armed Forces during the 2020 Nagorno-Karabakh war killing 2 crew members and injuring 1 more. Days later, after the signing of the ceasefire agreement, Russian peacekeepers were deployed to Nagorno-Karabakh with aviation for patrolling its borders.

2021–present

Modernization plans and programs carried out since the 2010s are being continued into 2021 as a part of Russia's State Armament Program for 2018–2027.

VVS role in the Russian invasion of Ukraine

On  24 February 2022, the VVS was deployed in support of the invasion of Ukraine. The VVS had reportedly deployed about 300 combat aircraft within range of Ukraine. Aircraft have also been deployed in Belarus for sorties over Ukraine.

On 25 February 2022, Ukrainian forces reportedly destroyed several aircraft and set a Russian airbase on fire in the Millerovo air base attack.

On 13 March 2022, Russian forces launched cruise missile attacks on Yavoriv military base near the Polish border.

As of 20 March 2022, it was claimed that VVS carried out at least 1403 airstrikes on Ukraine since beginning of the invasion.

The VVS has generally been noted by its relative absence from the invasion and has as of 25 March 2022 failed to subdue Ukrainian air defenses or the Ukrainian Air Force. It has, as of April 1, 2022, also failed to achieve air supremacy. Failure to achieve this has been attributed to the lack of SEAD operations on the part of the VVS likely due to the lack of flying hours for Russian pilots as well as the lack of dedicated SEAD units and precision-guided munitions within the VVS.  These weaknesses have been compounded by the mobility of Ukrainian air defenses with the extensive use of MANPADS as well as NATO reportedly sharing early warning information with Ukrainian forces. According to Ukrainian MoD, as of 16 March 2022, the VVS has also suffered at least 77 aircraft losses, however only 12 were verified by independent sources at the time.

In the first six months of the campaign, Russia's air war was largely a failure. An American intelligence analyst said that less than 40% of the 2,154 missiles fired by Russia hit their targets, such as the Zatoka bridge which sustained over eight air attacks before being disabled. The VVS reportedly flew over 20,000 sorties in the war, fewer than 3,000 of which entered Ukrainian airspace, possibly due to fear of Ukraine's sustained air defense.

The VVS has struck civilian targets during the invasion prompting an International Criminal Court investigation in Ukraine. Notably, during the battle of Mariupol it struck a hospital as well as a theatre.

Russian pilots in Ukraine are having to use civilian GPS units “taped to the dashboards”.

On 19 September US Air Force General James B. Hecker said that Russia has lost 55 military aircraft due to being shot down by Ukrainian air defences since the start of the invasion. He credits this success to the Ukrainian use of SA-11 and SA-10 air defence systems. As the US doesn't have these systems getting new missiles from European allies is a "big ask" from Kyiv. Russian airplanes increased their operations due to the September 2022 Ukrainian Kharkiv Oblast counteroffensive. This was due to a number of factors including changing front lines, former safe territory is now held by the enemy. Or due to the fact that they were under pressure to provide closer ground support.

On 8 October 2022 the chief of the VVS Sergey Surovikin became the commander of all Russian forces invading Ukraine.

On 10 October 2022 the VVS re-commenced the bombardment of cities like Kyiv and especially energy infrastructure like electricity grid facilities. The large-scale coordinated attacks also hit Kharkiv, Kryvyi Rih, Lviv, Dnipro, Ternopil, Kremenchuk, Khmelnytskyi, and Zhytomyr. The oblasts of Kyiv, Khmelnytskyi, Lviv, Dnipropetrovsk, Vinnytsia, Ivano-Frankivsk, Zaporizhzhia, Sumy, Kharkiv, Zhytormyr, Kirovohrad were attacked on this day. When, by 17 October, these energy infrastructure attacks continued unabated the western media labelled the delivery system "kamikaze drones", and Ukrainian president Zelensky called this "terrorising the civilian population". By 23 October (not yet two weeks) 40% of Ukrainians were without electricity and/or water.

Leadership

Previously the highest military office until 1 August 2015.

Since the merger between the VVS and the Russian Aerospace Defence Forces on 1 August 2015, the commander of the VVS as part of the new Russian Aerospace Forces is titled Deputy Commander-in-Chief of the Russian Aerospace Forces and Commander of the VVS. Lieutenant General Andrey Yudin became the first holder of the position until he was succeeded by Lieutenant General Sergey Dronov in August 2019.

Structure 

In 2009 the structure of the VVS was completely changed to a command-air base structure from the previous structure of air army-air division or corps-air regiment. The VVS is now divided to four operational commands, the Aerospace Defense Operational Strategic Command (seemingly primarily made up of the former Special Purpose Command), the Military Transport Aviation Command, and the Long-Range Aviation Command. This listing is a composite; the available new information covers frontline forces, and the forces of central subordination are as of approximately August 2008. Warfare.ru maintains what appears to be a reasonably up to date listing, and Combat Aircraft magazine in June 2010 listed their organisation's estimate of the new order of battle.

This listing appears to be as of June 2009:

Regional air armies 
 1st Aerospace Defence Forces Army (Moscow)
4th Aerospace Defense brigade (Dolgoprudnyi, Moscow Oblast)
5th Aerospace Defense brigade (Petrovskoe, Moscow Oblast)
6th Aerospace Defense brigade (Rzhev, Tver Oblast) (former 32nd Corps of PVO?)
6963rd aviation base (Kursk Vostochny Airport) (Su-30, MiG-29SMT/UBT)
6968th fighter aviation base (Borisovsky Khotilovo, Tver Oblast) (Su-27, MiG-31B, MiG-31BM, Su-24)
6th Air and Air Defence Forces Army (Voronezh) (Western Military District)
1st Aerospace Defense brigade (Severomorsk)
2nd Aerospace Defense brigade (St. Petersburg)
6961st aviation base (Petrozavodsk Airport) (Su-27)
6964th aviation base (Monchegorsk Air Base, Murmansk Oblast) (Su-24M, Su-24MR)
6965th aviation base (Vyazma Airport, Smolensk Oblast) (Mi-8TM, Mi-24V, Mi-28N)
7000th aviation base (Voronezh Malshevo Air Base) (Su-24M, Su-24MR, Su-34)
14th Air and Air Defence Forces Army (Yekaterinburg) (Central Military District)
8th Aerospace Defense brigade (Yekaterinburg)
9th Aerospace Defense brigade (Novosibirsk)
10th Aerospace Defense brigade (Chita)
6977th Aviation Base (Bolshoye Savino Airport, Perm Krai) (MiG-31BM)
6979th aviation base (Kansk Air Base, Krasnoyarsk Krai) (MiG-31BM)
6980th aviation base (Chelyabinsk Shagol Airport) (Su-24M)
6982nd aviation base (Domna Air Base, Zabaykalsky Krai) (MiG-29, Su-30SM)
11th Air and Air Defence Forces Army (Khabarovsk) (Eastern Military District)
 11th Aerospace Defense brigade (Komsomolsk-na-Amur)
12th Aerospace Defense brigade (Vladivostok)
 6983rd aviation base (Komsomolsk-on-Amur Airport, Khabarovsk Krai) (Su-27SM, Su-30M2, Su-35S, Su-34)
 6988th aviation base (Khurba, Khabarovsk Krai) (Su-24M, Su-24M2, Su-24MR)
 6989th aviation base (Vladivostok International Airport) (Su-27SM)
 265th transport aviation base (Khabarovsk)
4th Air and Air Defence Forces Army – (former 4th and 5th Armies of VVS and PVO) (Rostov-on-Don) (Southern Military District)
 7th Aerospace Defense brigade (Rostov-on-Don)
 8th Aerospace Defense brigade (Yekaterinburg)
 6970th aviation base (Morozovsk, Rostov Oblast) (Su-24M, Su-34)
 6971st aviation base (Budyonnovsk, Stavropol Krai) (Su-25SM, Mi-8AMTSh, Mi-24V, Mi-28N)
 6972nd aviation base (Krymsk, Krasnodar Krai) (Su-27, Mi-8, Mi-24P, Mi-28N, Ka-27)
 6974th aviation base (Korenovsk, Krasnodar Krai) (Mi-8MTV-5, Mi-24V, Mi-35M, Mi-28N)
 999th aviation base (Kant Air Base, Kyrgyzstan) (Su-25, Su-27, Mi-8T)
229th transport aviation base (Rostov-on-Don) (Mi-26(T), Mi-8AMTSh(TM))

Military Transport Aviation Command 
Headquarters: Moscow
6955th Aviation Base (Migalovo (Tver)) (Il-76MD)
6956th Aviation Base (Orenburg) (Il-76MD)
6958th Aviation Base (Taganrog, Rostov Oblast) (Il-76MD)
6985th Aviation Base (Pskov Airport) (Il-76MF)

Long-Range Aviation Command 
Headquarters Moscow
 6950th Aviation Base (Engels-2, Saratov Oblast) (Tu-22 M3, Tu-95 MS6, Tu-160) former 22nd Guards Heavy Bomber Aviation Division
 6952nd Aviation Base (Ukrainka Air Base, Amur Oblast) (Tu-95 MS16)
 6953rd Aviation Base (Belaya Air Base, located at Sredni, Irkutsk Oblast) (Tu-22 M3)

Forces of Central Subordination 
132nd Central Communications Center, Balashikha, Zarya airport, Moscow Oblast
1st Fighter-Bomber Aviation Regiment – Su-24 – Lebyazhye – absorbed by 6970th Aviation Base, 1 September 2009
764th Fighter Aviation Regiment – MiG-31, MiG-25PU – Bolshoye Savino Airport (Sokol)
8th Special Purpose Aviation Division (Chkalovsky Airport)
353rd Special Purpose Aviation Regiment— Chkalovsky Airport — Il-18, Il-76, Аn-12, Аn-72, Тu-134, Тu-154.
354th Special Purpose Aviation Regiment— Chkalovsky Airport — Il-18, Il-76, Аn-12, Аn-72, Тu-134, Тu-154.
206th Special Purpose Aviation Base — Chkalovsky Airport — Mi-8 helicopters.
223rd Flight Unit – commercial transport – Chkalovsky Airport – Il-62M, Il-76MD, Tu-134A-3, Tupolev Tu-154B-2
2457th Air Base of Long Range Radiolocation Detection Aircraft – A-50, A-50М – Ivanovo Severny
929th State Flight Test Centre named for V. P. Chkalov (Akhtubinsk)
1338th Test Centre – Chkalovsky Airport – Ilyushin Il-22, Ilyushin Il-80, and Il-82
High-altitude mountain Center for Air Materiel and Weapons Research – Nalchik
368th Detached Composite Aviation Squadron (An-12)

13th Aeronautic Test Facility – Volsk – air balloons

267th Center of Test Pilots Training – Akhtubinsk
4th Centre for Combat Training and Flight Personnel Training – Lipetsk Air Base
968th Sevastopol Composite Training and Research Aviation Regiment, Lipetsk Air Base, fighter jets MiG-29, Su-27, Su-27M, Su-30, bombers Su-24M, Su-24M2, Su-34, reconnaissance plane Su-24MP, jammer Su-24MP, strike-fighter Su-25, Su-25T, Su-25SM
3958th Guards Kerch Aviation Base, Savasleyka, Nizhegorod Oblast, MiG-31.
185th Centre for Combat Training and Flight Personnel Training – Astrakhan
 116th Training center operational use — Аstrakhan — MiG-23, MiG-29
 42nd Training center operational use — Ashuluk — SAM and targets.
344th Centre for Combat Training and Flight Personnel Training – Torzhok (ground forces helicopters) (:ru:344 Центр боевой подготовки и переучивания лётного состава армейской авиации)
696th Research and Instruction Helicopter Regiment (Torzhok)(Ka-50, Mi-8, Mi-24, Mi-26, has used Mi-28)
92nd Research and Instruction Helicopter Squadron (Sokol-Vladimir (Ruwiki says Klin)) (Mi-8, Mi-24)
924th Centre for Combat Training and Flight Personnel Training – Yegoryevsk Base UAV.
 275th Separate research and UAV squadron instructors(Unmanned Aerial Vehicles), Yegoryevsk, Moscow Oblast. UAV Tu-143, Yak PCHELA-1T, IAI Searcher 2 .
Russian State Scientific-Research Institute Centre for Cosmonaut Training – Zvezdnyi Goronok
 70th Separate test and training Aviation Regiment Special Purpose — Chkalovski — Il-76 and other.
2881st Reserve Helicopter Base – Totskoye – Mi-24P
5th Independent Long-Range Reconnaissance Aviation Detachment – Voronezh (CFE and INF verification)
185th Centre for Combat Training and Flight Personnel Training – Astrakhan
118th Independent Helicopter Squadron – Chebenki (Dmitriyevka), Orenburg Oblast
4020th Base for Reserve Aircraft – Lipetsk
4215th Base for Reserve Aircraft – Chebenki
15th Army Aviation Brigade of the Western Military District at the airport Ostrov, Pskov Oblast

Warehouses, Storage and Maintenance Depots, Aircraft Repair Plants
 (Russian: List of Aircraft Factories in Russia)
Central Aviation Base of Rocket Armament and Ammunition, Sergiyev Posad, Moscow Oblast

Aviation Warehouse of Rocket Armament and Ammunition, Yoshkar-Ola

Supply and Storage Depot of Air Defense Rocket Armament, Serpukhov, Moscow Oblast

Storage and Maintenance Depot of Unmanned Aerial Vehicles, Yaroslavl (Tunoshna)

502nd Military Equipment Maintenance Plant, Fryazevo (Noginsk-5)

1015th Military Equipment Maintenance Plant, Nizhniye Sergi-3, Sverdlovsk Oblast

1019th Military Equipment Maintenance Plant, Onokhoy-2, Buryat Republic

1253rd Central Radar Armament Maintenance Base, Samara-28

2227th Armament Maintenance and Storage Base, Trudovaya, Moscow Oblast

2503rd Central Base of Automated Control Systems Maintenance, Yanino-1, Leningrad Oblast

2529th Central Base of Armament Maintenance, Khabarovsk

2633rd Base of Armament Maintenance and Storage, Lyubertsy, Moscow Oblast

3821st Base of Armament Maintenance and Storage, Tosno, Leningrad Oblast

20th Aircraft Overhaul Plant, Pushkin-3 (not an inhabited locality, or name is misspelled), Leningrad Oblast

150th Aircraft Overhaul Plant, Lyublino-Novoye, Kaliningrad Oblast

419th Aircraft Overhaul Plant, Gorelovo, Leningrad Oblast
695th Aircraft Overhaul Plant (Factory), Aramil, Sverdlovsk Oblast

99th Air-Technical Equipment Plant, Ostafyevo (Shcherbinka), Moscow Oblast

5212nd Testing and Control (Docking?) Station, Znamensk, Astrakhan Oblast

Training and Research Organisations
 2nd Central Scientific-Research Institute — Tver
 13th State Scientific Research Institute "ERAT"  Luberchi, Moscow Oblast
 30th Central Scientific-Research Institute (ЦНИИ АКТ) — Shelkovo, also includes research institutes in Noginsk.
 Gagarin Military Air Academy (VVA) — Monino
 Zhukovsky Air Force Engineering Academy — Moscow 
 Zhukov Command Academy of Air Defense — Tver ( branch in the St. Petersburg )
 Yaroslavl Anti-aircraft Missile Defence Institute
 Chelyabinsk Red Banner Military Aviation Institute of Navigators
 604th Training Aviation Regiment — Chelyabinsk Shagol Airport
 Voronezh Central Military Aviation Engineering University (VCMAEU)
Both the Irkutsk Military Aviation Engineering Institute and the Tambov Military Aviation Engineering Institute were disbanded in 2009 and transferred to VCMAEU.
 Krasnodar Military Aviation Institute (L-39Cs); by 2016, the Krasnodar Higher Military Aviation Pilots College Named for Hero of the Soviet Union A.K. Serov
 704th Training Aviation Regiment — Котельниково — L-39
 627th Training Aviation Regiment — Тихорецк — Л-39
 797th Training Aviation Regiment — Кущевская — L-39, Su-25, Su-27, MiG-29
Syzran Military Aviation Institute (Mi-2, Mi-8T and Mi-24V, Ansat, Ka-226T
 131st Training Aviation Regiment — Saratov-Sokol — Mi-2, Mi-8
 484th Training Helicopter Regiment — Syzran airfield — Mi-24
 626th Training Helicopter Regiment — Pugachev — Mi-2, Mi-8, Mi-24
 Branch in Kirov, Kirov Oblast
 783rd Training Centre (Armavir) (MiG-29, L-39C)
 713th Training Aviation Regiment — Armavir — L-39, MiG-29
761st Training Aviation Regiment — Khanskaya — L-39
 786th Training Centre (Borisoglebsk):
 160th Training Aviation Regiment — Borisoglebsk — Su-27
 644th Training Aviation Regiment — Michurinsk — L-39, Su-24, Su-25, MiG-29
 705th Training Aviation Center for Training Flight Crews and Long-Range military transport aircraft – Balashov:
606th Training Aviation Regiment – Balashov
666th Training Aviation Regiment – Rtishchevo
 Center for anti-aircraft missile troops, Uchhoz (Gatchina-3), the Leningrad Region. Chief – Colonel Alexander Dobrovolsky.
 357th Training Center, Belgorod. Chief – Colonel Viktor Baranov.
 834th Centre for Signal Corps Radio and ensure, Novgorod. Chief – Colonel Vasily Fedosov.
 874th training center (settlement) of radio engineering troops, Vladimir. Chief – Colonel Yuri Balaban.
 902nd Training Center (settlement) of anti-aircraft missile troops Kosterevo-1, Vladimir Oblast.

Medical and athletic facilities
 State Research Institute of Aviation and Space Medicine, Moscow. Chief – Major-General Igor Ushakov.
 5th Central Military Research Aviation Hospital, Krasnogorsk-3, Moscow Region.
 7th Central Military Research Aviation Hospital, Moscow.
 Spa Air Force, Chemitokvadzhe, Krasnodar Krai. Chief – Colonel Theodore Barantsev.
 Central Sports Club VVS Samara. Chief – Colonel Dmitry Shlyahtin.
 361st Center of psychophysiological training of personnel, Agha, Krasnodar region.
 709th Center of psychophysiological training of personnel, Anapa (now Dzhubga), Krasnodar region.
 464th Training Center for Physical Culture and Sports, Ufa, Bashkortostan.

The list of Soviet Air Force bases shows a number which are still active with the Russian Air Force.

With the Air Force now fusing into one joint service branch the personnel from the Russian Aerospace Defence Forces and their respective facilities, the following now report to the Aerospace Forces HQ:

Space Command:
153rd Main Trial Centre for Testing and Control of Space Means named after G.S. Titov at Krasnoznamensk
820th Main Centre for Missile Attack Warning (SPRN) in Solnechnogorsk
821st Main Space Surveillance Centre (SKKP) in Noginsk-9, Moscow Oblast

Early warning of missile attack:
Voronezh radar at Lekhtusi, Armavir, Kaliningrad, Mileshevka, Yeniseysk, Barnaul
Daryal radar at Pechora
Volga radar at Hantsavichy
Dnepr radar at Balkhash, Irkutsk and Olenegorsk
Oko early warning satellites

Space surveillance:
Okno in Tajikistan
Krona in Zelenchukskaya and Nakhodka
RT-70 in Yevpatoria (since the 2014 Crimean crisis, the status of Crimea, and thus of the city of Yevpatoria which is located on Crimea, is under dispute between Russia and Ukraine; Ukraine and the majority of the international community considers Crimea and Yevpatoria an integral part of Ukraine, while Russia, on the other hand, considers Crimea and Yevpatoria an integral part of Russia) and Galenki (together with Roscosmos)

Missile defence:
A-135 anti-ballistic missile system
Don-2N radar
A-235 anti-ballistic missile system (future; after 2020)
Satellite systems:
Liana space reconnaissance and target designation system (3 electronic reconnaissance satellites 14F145 "Lotus-C1")
Air and Space Defence Command:
9th Missile Defence Division (A-135 anti-ballistic missile system) in Pushkino
4th Missile Defence Brigade in Dolgoprudny
5th Missile Defence Brigade in Vidnoye
6th Missile Defence Brigade in Rzhev
State Testing Plesetsk Cosmodrome
Kura Test Range

Equipment

The precise quantitative and qualitative composition of the VVS is unknown and figures include both serviceable and unserviceable aircraft as well as those placed into storage or sitting in reserve. FlightGlobal estimated that there were about 3,947 aircraft in inventory in 2015. According to the Russian Defense Ministry, the share of modern armament in the VVS had reached about 35% during 2014. The figure was raised to 66% by late 2016 and to 72% by late 2017.

Estimates provided by the IISS show that VVS combat pilots average 60 to 100 flight hours per year and pilots flying transport aircraft average 120 flight hours per year.

Squadrons
As of 2014:
8 × Bomber squadrons (4 operating Tu-22M3/MR; 3 operating Tu-95MS; 1 operating Tu-160)
37 × Fighter squadrons (8 operating MiG-29; 3 operating MiG-29SMT; 11 operating MiG-31/MiG-31BM; 10 operating Su-27; 4 operating Su-27SM1/Su-30M2; 1 operating Su-27SM3/Su-30M2)
27 × Attack squadrons (11 operating the Su-24M/Su-24M2; 13 operating Su-25/Su-25SM; 3 operating Su-34)
10 × Attack & Reconnaissance squadrons (1 operating Su-24M/MR; 8 operating Su-24MR; 1 operating Mig-25RB)
1 × AEW&C squadron (1 operating A-50/A50-U)
1 × Tanker squadron (1 operating Il-78/Il-78M)

Radars

The VVS operates several Nebo-M radars, that combine meter, decimeter and centimeter range. First two Nebo-M regiments were deployed in 2017 to Saint Petersburg and Kareliya. In 2018, further two regiments were deployed to Crimea and Penza. In 2019, a regiment was delivered to Volga region. In 2020, two regiments were deployed to the Far East and Naryan Mar.

Additionally, the VVS operates radars that work in meter range only. Such systems are Nebo-UM (first units were delivered in 2018 to Voronezh and Novosibirsk, and in 2020 to Rostov-on-Don) as well as Rezonans-NE radars that have been constructed in the Arctic in Zapolyarniy, Indiga, Shoyna and Nova Zemlya, with another in Gremikha under construction.

Ranks and insignia

The VVS inherited the ranks of the Soviet Union, although the insignia and uniform were slightly altered and the old Tsarist crown and double-headed eagle were re-introduced. The VVS uses the same rank structure as the Russian Ground Forces.

Aircraft procurement

Production of the Russian aerospace industry for the Russian Armed Forces, by year of manufacture (first flight):

Future of the Russian Air Force

See also
Awards and emblems of the Ministry of Defence of the Russian Federation
Orders, decorations, and medals of Russia
Honorary titles of Russia
List of Russian aviators
Air Intelligence of Russia

Notes

References 
Higham, Robin (editor). Russian Aviation and Air Power in the Twentieth Century. Routledge, 1998. 
Palmer, Scott W. Dictatorship of the Air: Aviation Culture and the Fate of Modern Russia. New York: Cambridge University Press, 2006.

Further reading 
Further sources include:

Piotr Butowsky. Force Report:Russian Air Force, Air Forces Monthly, August 2007 issue
Pyotr Butowski, Air Power Analysis: Russian Federation, Part 2, International Air Power Review, AIRTime Publishing, No.13, Summer 2004 (also Part 1 in a previous issue)
the extensive list of sources at 
Yefim Gordon, Dmitriy Komissarov, Russian Air Power, 2009 and 2011
Kommersant-Vlast, State of Russia's Air Forces 2008 No.33 (786) 25 August 2008 

Aleksandr Stukalin, Mikail Lukin, ‘Vys Rossiyskaya Armiya’, Kommersant-Vlast, Moscow, Russia, (14 May 2002)

External links

Russian Air Force Official site (English)
Kommersant-Vlast, State of Russia's Air Forces 2008 No.33 (786) 25 August 2008 
VVS Order of Battle (scramble.nl)
Photos Russian Air Force
Russian Military Aviation
"Russian Revival" – Russia's technological strategy for post-2010 airpower 

 
Military of Russia
Russian military aviation